Mika Seeger is an American ceramic artist. Although not primarily a musical artist, she did record a definitive version of "Great Green Gobs of Greasy, Grimy Gopher Guts". She is the daughter of filmmaker Toshi Seeger and Pete Seeger, a legendary American folk musician.

Ceramic murals
Mika's ceramic murals were often created with other artists, including local school children.
 Providence, Rhode Island India Point Park
 Cranston, Rhode Island Mural in Chester Barrow School 1994, Country & City" 1997
 Beacon, New York Under River 1990–92, Common Clay 1991–92
 Tiverton, Rhode Island Animal Alphabet 1994, A Walk Through Tiverton 1996–97
 Warwick, Rhode Island Under Creatures 1996, Friendship 1997
 Narragansett, Rhode Island 2007
 Friends Academy, North Dartmouth, Massachusetts 2012-14

Personal life
Seeger is married to Joe Bossom, with whom she has three children.

References

Artists from Rhode Island
Living people
Year of birth missing (living people)
Seeger family
American ceramists
People from Tiverton, Rhode Island
American artists of Japanese descent